|}
{| class="collapsible collapsed" cellpadding="0" cellspacing="0" style="clear:right; float:right; text-align:center; font-weight:bold;" width="280px"
! colspan="3" style="border:1px solid black; background-color: #77DD77;" | Also Ran

The 1984 Epsom Derby was the 205th annual running of the Derby horse race. It took place at Epsom Downs Racecourse on 6 June 1984. It was the first edition of the race to be commercially sponsored and was known as the Ever Ready Derby. The sponsorship meant that the first prize of £227,680 was the biggest in the history of the race.

The race was won by Luigi Miglietti's Secreto at odds of 14/1, ridden by Christy Roche and trained in Ireland by David O'Brien. The favourite El Gran Senor, trained by David O'Brien's father Vincent finished second by a short head. The colt's win was a first success in the race for owner, trainer and jockey. At the age of 27, David O'Brien was one of the youngest men to have trained a Derby winner.

Race details
 Sponsor: Ever Ready
 Winner's prize money: £227,680
 Going: Good
 Number of runners: 17
 Winner's time: 2 minutes, 39.12 seconds

Full result
Race result

Winner details
Further details of the winner, Secreto:

 Foaled: 12 February 1981, in Maryland, United States
 Sire: Northern Dancer; Dam: Betty's Secret (Secretariat)
 Owner: Luigi Miglietti
 Breeder: E. P. Taylor

Form analysis

Two-year-old races
Notable runs by the future Derby participants as two-year-olds in 1983:
 Alphabatim - 1st in William Hill Futurity
 El Gran Senor - 1st in Railway Stakes, 1st in National Stakes, 1st in Dewhurst Stakes
 Elegant Air - 2nd in Lanson Champagne Stakes, 1st in Horris Hill Stakes
 Ilium - 3rd in William Hill Futurity
 My Volga Boatman - 2nd in Horris Hill Stakes

The road to Epsom
Early-season appearances in 1984 and trial races prior to running in the Derby:
 Alphabatim – 1st in Sandown Classic Trial, 1st in Lingfield Derby Trial
 El Gran Senor – 1st in Gladness Stakes, 1st in 2000 Guineas
 Claude Monet – 1st in Heathorn Stakes, 1st in Dante Stakes
 Ilium - 1st in Predominate Stakes
 Kaytu – 1st in Chester Vase
 Long Pond – 1st in Blue Riband Trial Stakes
 Northern Fred – 2nd in Premio Presidente della Repubblica
 Pigwidgeon - 3rd in Heathorn Stakes
 Secreto – 1st in Tetrarch Stakes, 3rd in Irish 2000 Guineas
 Telios – 3rd in Craven Stakes

Subsequent Group 1 wins
Group 1 / Grade I victories after running in the Derby.

 Alphabatim – Hollywood Turf Cup (1984, 1986)
 At Talaq – Grand Prix de Paris (1984), Melbourne Cup (1986)
 El Gran Senor – Irish Derby (1984)

Subsequent breeding careers

Leading progeny of participants in the 1984 Epsom Derby.

Sires of Classic winners
El Gran Senor (2nd)
 Rodrigo De Triano - 1st 2000 Guineas Stakes, 1st Irish 2,000 Guineas (1992)
 Belmez - 1st King George VI and Queen Elizabeth Stakes (1990)
 Gran Alba - 1st Christmas Hurdle (1991)
 Toussaud - 1st Criterion Stakes (1992) dam of Empire Maker, Chester House and Chiselling
Secreto (1st) - Exported to USA - Later exported to Japan
 Mystiko - 1st 2000 Guineas Stakes (1991)
 Tamuro Cherry - 1st Hanshin Juvenile Fillies (2001)
 Miss Secreto - 1st Premio Regina Elena (1989)
 Staunch Friend - 1st Bula Hurdle (1993)
At Talaq (4th)
 Star Of Maple - 1st Rosehill Guineas (1994)
 Skating - 1st Winfield Classic (1993)
 Toledo - 1st Newmarket Handicap (2001)
 Al Mansour - 1st George Ryder Stakes (2000)

Sires of Group/Grade One winners
Elegant Air (12th)
 Dashing Blade - 1st Dewhurst Stakes (1989), Leading sire in Germany (1998)
 Air de Rien - 1st Prix Saint-Alary (1990)
 Ocean Air - 2nd Premio Lydia Tesio (1991)
 Montpelier Lad - 1st Anniversary Hurdle (1991)

Sires of National Hunt horses
Alphabatim (5th)
 Golden Alpha - 1st Red Rum Handicap Chase (2003)
 Mr Nosie - 1st Deloitte Novice Hurdle (2006)
 Nosie Betty - Dam of Cole Harden
Cataldi (17th)
 Trouble Ahead - 1st AGFA Diamond Handicap Chase (2000)
 Betty's Boy - 1st National Hunt Handicap Chase (1999)

Other Stallions
Claude Monet (13th) - Artistic Reef (3rd King George Stakes 1992), Sweet Revival (dam of Sweet Return) - Later exported to South AfricaTelios (6th) - Exported to Japan - Mejiro Lambada (1st Nikkei Shinshun Hai 1997)Long Pond (7th) - Midnights Daughter (dam of One Knight)Kaytu (8th) - Sired minor jumps winnersIlium (10th) - Sired minor jumps winnersMighty Flutter (3rd) - Exported to SpainSheer Heights (9th) - Exported to Saudi ArabiaMy Volga Boatman (14th) - Exported to TurkeyNorthern Fred (16th) - Exported to Australia

References

External links
 Colour Chart – Derby 1984

Epsom Derby
Epsom Derby
Epsom Derby
Epsom Derby
 1984
20th century in Surrey